Janet Douglas, Lady Glamis (c. 1498 – 17 July 1537) was a Scottish noblewoman accused of witchcraft, who was executed by burning during the reign of James V of Scotland.

Treason and charges of witchcraft
The Douglas family was far from favoured by King James V of Scotland; Janet's brother, Archibald Douglas, 6th Earl of Angus, was the King's stepfather, and Angus had imprisoned the young James. James' hatred for Angus extended to his whole family, including Janet. After James had broken free of the Douglas family, in December 1528, Janet was summoned for treason. She was accused with others for bringing supporters of the Earl of Angus to Edinburgh in June. However, James called her "our lovittis Dame Jonat Douglas" in a licence of 1529, allowing her and a co-accused Patrick Charteris of Cuthilgurdy to go on pilgrimage, and be exempt from legal proceedings.

A recent historian, Jamie Cameron, thinks it unlikely that Janet went on pilgrimage, as she was the subject of a number of legal actions culminating in a charge of poisoning her husband John Lyon, 6th Lord Glamis who had died on 17 September 1528. This case was dropped, and Janet was free to marry her second husband, Archibald Campbell of Skipness by the summer of 1532. However, on 17 July 1537, Janet was convicted of planning to poison the King, and communicating with her brothers, the Earl of Angus and George Douglas.

James had Janet accused of witchcraft against him, although it was clear that the accusations were false. She was imprisoned with her husband (who escaped but was later killed) in a dungeon of Edinburgh Castle. It was easy for James to imprison Janet, but actually convicting her was more difficult. To gain "evidence", James had Janet's family members and servants subjected to torture. Janet was convicted and burned at the stake on 17 July 1537 by Edinburgh Castle, which her young son was forced to watch.

Family
She was the daughter of George Douglas, Master of Angus and Elizabeth Drummond, daughter of John Drummond, 1st Lord Drummond. She married firstly to John Lyon, 6th Lord Glamis (1492–1528) and by him had issue:

 John Lyon, 7th Lord Glamis
 George Lyon 
 Margaret Lyon 
 Elizabeth Lyon, married 1st: John Forbes, Master of Forbes; married 2nd:  Thomas Craig of Balnely; married 3rd: John Tulloch of Montcoffer; married 4th: John Abernethy.

Janet, Lady Glamis married secondly Archibald Campbell of Skipnish, second son of Archibald Campbell, 2nd Earl of Argyll, and had issue:

 John Campbell, of Skipness, Provost of Kilmun

References

External links
Profile on Douglas Family History

1490s births
1537 deaths
Year of birth uncertain
People executed for witchcraft
Executed Scottish women
Executed British people
16th-century Scottish people
Court of James V of Scotland
Ladies of Parliament
People executed by the Kingdom of Scotland by burning
16th-century executions by Scotland
Witchcraft in Scotland
Witch trials in Scotland